The 2019–20 East of Scotland Football League (known as the Central Taxis East of Scotland League for sponsorship reasons) was the 91st season of the East of Scotland Football League, and the 6th season as the sixth tier of the Scottish football pyramid system. The season began on 27 July 2019. Bonnyrigg Rose Athletic were the reigning champions but could not defend their title after being promoted to the Lowland Football League.

The league reverted to a two-tier setup for the first time since 2015, featuring a Premier Division of 16 teams and a First Division containing two seeded parallel conferences each with 12 teams.

On 13 March 2020, the league was indefinitely suspended due to the 2019–20 coronavirus outbreak before it was officially curtailed on 24 April 2020. Bo'ness United were declared champions of the Premier Division on a 'points per game' method while Lothian Thistle Hutchison Vale and Tynecastle were declared winners of their respective First Division conferences.

Teams
The following teams changed division after the 2018–19 season.

To East of Scotland Football League
Relegated from Lowland Football League
 Whitehill Welfare
Transferred from East Superleague
 Glenrothes
Transferred from East Premier League North
 Kinnoull

From East of Scotland Football League
Promoted to Lowland Football League
 Bonnyrigg Rose Athletic
Withdrawn
 Eyemouth United

Premier Division

Teams
The Premier Division contains the top five teams from each of the three Conferences in the 2018–19 season, the best 6th-placed team (Sauchie Juniors) and Whitehill Welfare who were relegated from the Lowland League.

Stadia and locations

League table

Results

First Division
The teams who did not qualify for the Premier Division, along with Glenrothes, were ranked according to their position and points in each Conference before being assigned into two seeded First Division Conferences A and B. Kinnoull later took the place of Eyemouth, who withdrew from the league.

Conference A

Stadia and locations

League table

Conference B

Stadia and locations

League table

Results
Teams in each Conference play each other twice, once at home and once away. Teams also play each team from the other Conference once (six home and six away), for a total of 34 games.

First Division play-offs
Play-offs were due to be held to decide the overall First Division winner, and if necessary the third team to be promoted to the Premier Division. These were subsequently cancelled as a result of the coronavirus pandemic.

Notes
 Club has an SFA Licence (as of July 2019) and are eligible to participate in the Lowland League promotion play-off should they win the Premier Division.

References

6
 
SCO
Scotland